Grinnell Point is located in the Lewis Range, Glacier National Park in the U.S. state of Montana. Grinnell Point is an oft-photographed mountain, situated conspicuously just west of Swiftcurrent Lake across from the Many Glacier Hotel. Grinnell Point is named for George Bird Grinnell.

See also
 Mountains and mountain ranges of Glacier National Park (U.S.)

References

Mountains of Glacier County, Montana
Mountains of Glacier National Park (U.S.)
Lewis Range